Əmircan (also, Amirdzhan) is a village and municipality in the Qakh Rayon of Azerbaijan.  It has a population of 567.

References 

Populated places in Qakh District